Salem Rewani  (born February 28, 1977) is a Libyan former football striker who played for Al Madina, Al Nasr, Al-Ittihad and Al Khums.  He also was a member of the Libya national football team.

Honours
Libyan Premier League 4
Al Madina 2001 and Al-Ittihad 2005, 2006, 2007
Libyan Cup 2
Al-Ittihad 2005, 2007
Libyan SuperCup 4
Al-Ittihad 2004, 2005, 2006, 2007
 Libyan top scorer in different African Club Competitions (13 goals).
 CAF Champions League 2001 with Al Madina (2 goals)
 CAF Confederation Cup 2005 with Al-Ittihad (4 goals)
 CAF Champions League 2007 with Al-Ittihad (7 goals)
 43rd in the World's Top Goal Scorer 2007 
 Salem Rewani has Scored Amazing goal from 75 meters distance, in the CAF Champions League 2007 match against Mogas 90  of  Benin.

External links

Player profile with Photo – Sporting-heroes.net
Player profile – MTN Africa Cup of Nations 2006

References

1977 births
Living people
Libyan footballers
Libya international footballers
2006 Africa Cup of Nations players
Association football forwards
Al-Nasr SC (Benghazi) players
Al-Madina SC players
Libyan Premier League players